Melanie Margalis (born December 30, 1991) is an American competitive swimmer who specializes in the freestyle, breaststroke and individual medley events. She currently represents the Cali Condors which is part of the International Swimming League.

Career

High school career
Margalis graduated from Countryside High School, where she was also a club swimmer for Saint Petersburg Aquatics. There, she was coached by Fred Lewis. In high school swimming, she was a three-time state champion and held the state record in the 200-yard IM. For four years in a row, Margalis was named her teams’ MVP. Proving her versatility, she also swam the 500-yard free in 2009 in which she also won a state championship. After her performances that season, she was named the 2009-2010 Pinellas County Female Athlete of the Year. That same year, she was named to the National Youth Championship Team.

College career
Margalis helped the Georgia Bulldogs swimming and diving women's team at the University of Georgia win the NCAA Division I women's team title in 2013 and again in 2014.

2013
Margalis won gold in the 4x200-meter freestyle relay as a member of the preliminary team and bronze in the 200-meter individual medley at the 2013 World University Games in Kazan, Russia.

2014
At the 2014 National Championships, Margalis won the 200-meter IM and finished third in both the 400-meter IM and 200-meter breaststroke to earn a roster spot on the Pan Pac team — she finished 12th in the 400-meter IM and ninth in the 200-meter IM. Later that year she also competed at the 2014 FINA World Swimming Championships (25 m), swimming the IM events. She won a bronze in the 200-meter IM and finished sixth in the 100-meter IM.

2015
At the 2015 World Aquatics Championships in Kazan, Russia Margalis swam a 2:10.41 to finish 7th.

2016
At the 2016 Summer Olympics in Rio de Janeiro, Brazil Margalis won the gold medal with the U.S. women's 4x200-meter freestyle relay team.

2017
At the 2017 World Aquatics Championships Margalis had a strong swim in the 200-meter IM, but could not hold off the final 50 surge of US teammate Madisyn Cox, and finished fourth. In 4x200-meter freestyle relay, Leah Smith led off for the Americans in a personal best 1:55.97.  Mallory Comerford (1:56.92) and Margalis (1:56.48) took over the middle legs of the relay as they battled down the stretch with China and Russia. It was a very tight race with China going into the final leg, but Katie Ledecky took off with a 1:54.02 split to help the Americans strike gold again.

At the 2017 Winter Nationals Championships Margalis had a busy weekend as she competed in five individual events and managed to grab three individual titles. She broke the Championship Record in the 200-yard IM with the time of 1:52.63 and finished first in 400-yard IM and 100-yard breaststroke.

2018
At the 2018 Pan Pacific Swimming Championships Margalis secured a silver medal in the 400-meter IM with a time of 4:35.60.

At the 2018 FINA World Swimming Championships (25 m) Margalis earned the silver medal in the 400-meter IM, turning in a career-best time of 4:25.84 in the event finals. She was also runnerup in the 200-meter IM (personal best 2:04.62) and finished fourth in the 100-meter IM, clocking a 58.32, just .21 of a second off the podium. Margalis was a part of two medal winning relay teams, earning gold in the 4×100-meter medley relay and silver in the 4×200-meter freestyle relay.

2019

2019 World Championships
At the 2019 World Aquatics Championships Margalis placed 4th in the final once again in a time of 2:08.91. On Day 5, Margalis raced in the 4×200-meter free relay, where she split 1:55.81 to help USA to a new American record and silver medal behind Australia.

International Swimming League
In 2019 she was a member of the inaugural International Swimming League representing the Cali Condors, who finished third place in the final match in Las Vegas, Nevada in December. During the season Margalis went undefeated in the 400-meter IM breaking the American record several times along the way.

See also

List of University of Georgia people

References

External links
 
 
 
 
 

1991 births
Living people
American female freestyle swimmers
American female medley swimmers
Georgia Bulldogs women's swimmers
Swimmers at the 2016 Summer Olympics
Olympic gold medalists for the United States in swimming
Medalists at the 2016 Summer Olympics
World Aquatics Championships medalists in swimming
Sportspeople from Clearwater, Florida
Universiade medalists in swimming
Universiade gold medalists for the United States
Universiade bronze medalists for the United States
Medalists at the 2013 Summer Universiade
Medalists at the FINA World Swimming Championships (25 m)
21st-century American women